Tisis plautata is a moth in the family Lecithoceridae. It was described by Chun-Sheng Wu in 1998. It is found in Indonesia (western Java).

References

External links
Original description: 

Moths described in 1998
Tisis